The Barcelona Vampiress is a 2020 Spanish historical thriller film directed by  which stars Nora Navas as the title character and Roger Casamajor alongside Bruna Cusí, Francesc Orella, Sergi López, Mario Gas, and Núria Prims. It is shot in Catalan.

Plot 
Set in 1912 Barcelona, the plot concerns about the endeavours of morphine-addicted journalist Sebastià Comas to unravel the truth about the kidnappings and killings of children scapegoated by the police to Enriqueta Martí, nicknamed as the "Vampire of the Raval".

Cast

Production 
The screenplay was penned by Maria Jaén and Lluís A. Martínez. The film is a Brutal Media and Filmax production, with the participation of TVC.

Release 
The film was presented at the 53rd Sitges Film Festival in October 2020. Distributed by Filmax, the film was theatrically released in Spain on 4 December 2020.

Reception 
Javier Ocaña of El País deemed the film to be "an ambitious, sometimes grandiloquent work, which always comes to fruition with courage and singularity" when retelling the events of 1912, managing to portray a country's moral mysery.

Toni Vall of Cinemanía rated the film 2½ out of 5 stars, pointing out that the cast was "uneven", featuring "a solvent but not brilliant [male] lead", with Danés otherwise rather pulling his best in the representation of the setting (El Raval).

Accolades 

|-
| rowspan = "14" align = "center" | 2021 || rowspan = "14" | 13th Gaudí Awards || colspan = "2" | Best Film ||  || rowspan = "14" | 
|-
| Best Director || Lluís Danés || 
|-
| Best Actress || Nora Navas || 
|-
| Best Production Supervision || David Masllorens i Silva || 
|-
| Best Art Direction || Lluís Danés || 
|-
| rowspan = "2" | Best Supporting Actress || Bruna Cusí || 
|-
| Núria Prims || 
|-
| Best Supporting Actor || Francesc Orella || 
|-
| Best Original Music || Alfred Tapscott || 
|-
| Best Cinematography || Josep M. Civit || 
|-
| Best Costume Design || Mercè Paloma || 
|-
| Best Sound || Daniela Fermín, Quique López, Carlos Jiménez || 
|-
| Best Visual Effects || Lluís Rivera, Aleix Torrecillas, Anna Aragonès || 
|-
| Best Makeup and Hairstyles || Laura Pérez, Xavi Valverde || 
|}

See also 
 List of Spanish films of 2020

References 

2020s Catalan-language films
Films set in Barcelona
Films set in 1912
2020 crime thriller films
Spanish crime thriller films
Spanish historical drama films
Filmax films
2020s Spanish films